Leland O. Bush is an American lawyer and judge, who has served as a Judge of the District Court of Minnesota since 2002, when he was appointed by Governor Jesse Ventura. He was elected to a full term in 2004. He was re-elected in 2010 and in 2016.

Early life and education
Born in Russell, Minnesota. Bush attended Macalester College in St. Paul, Minnesota. Bush's eldest brother was roommates with Kofi Annan while at Macalester College.  Bush transferred to Southwest State University in Marshall, Minnesota, where he earned a B.A. in Biology from in May 1973. Bush attended the University of Minnesota Law School, graduating with his J.D. in 1976.

Legal career
Following his law school graduation, Bush was admitted to the Minnesota bar later that year. Bush worked for David Watson in Tyler, Minnesota before starting his own firm in 1979. In 2002, he was appointed to the District Court of Minnesota bench by Governor Jesse Ventura. Bush also worked as a city attorney during this period until his appointment to the Minnesota state bench.

Judicial service
Bush was appointed by then-Governor Jesse Ventura on April 26, 2002. After being appointed to the position in April 2002, he was elected to a full term in 2004. Bush was re-elected to consecutive terms in 2010 and 2016. In 2018, Bush retired from active status after 16 years on the bench.

References

External links
 http://judgepedia.org/Leland_Bush

1951 births
Living people
Minnesota state court judges
People from Lyon County, Minnesota
Southwest Minnesota State University alumni
University of Minnesota Law School alumni